William H. Seely III is a major general in the United States Marine Corps, who served as the 35th Commandant of the Joint Forces Staff College (JFSC) in Norfolk, Virginia from August 2020 to August 2021.  He began serving as the Director of Marine Corps Intelligence in August 2021.

Education

He graduated with a Bachelor's Degree from American University, Washington D.C. and was commissioned through Naval Reserve Officers Training Corps (NROTC), George Washington University (1989). He earned a Master's Degree from Oklahoma State University, National Intelligence University, and the Naval War College with distinction.

Military education

In 1989, he graduated from The Basic School in Quantico, Virginia.

In 1990, he graduated from the Basic Communication Officer Course in Quantico, Virginia.

In 1991, he graduated from United States Army Airborne School.

In 1992, he graduated from United States Navy SCUBA School.

In 1993, he graduated from MAGTF Intelligence Officers Course.

In 1994, he graduated from Weapons and Tactics Instructor Course.

In 1995, he graduated from the United States Army Military Intelligence Officer Advanced Course.

In 1996, he graduated from Amphibious Warfare School, Non-Resident Course.

In 1996, he graduated from Urban Reconnaissance Course.

In 2002, he graduated from United States Marine Corps Command and Staff College, Non-Resident Course (JPME-1).

In 2003, he graduated from Survival, Evasion, Resistance and Escape (SERE) School.

In 2005, he graduated from the Post-Graduate Intelligence Program DIA.

In 2010, he graduated from the College of Naval Warfare, Naval War College (JPME-II).

In 2014, he graduated from the Senior Planners Course at the Marine Corps University.

Command

1990-1992: Communications Platoon Commander, H&S Company, 3rd Reconnaissance Battalion.

2000-2002: Company Commander, India Company, Marine Cryptologic Support Battalion, Kunia, Hawaii.

2006-2008: Battalion Commander, 3rd Reconnaissance Battalion, 3rd Marine Division.

2011-2013: Commander, Marine Corps Intelligence Schools, Training Command.

Jun 2016 - May 2017 - Director of Marine Corps Intelligence

2017 - 2019 - Marine Corps Director of Communication

2019 - 2020 - Commander, Task Force-Iraq (TF-Iraq), CJTF - Operation Inherent Resolve

Aug 2020 - Aug 2021 - Commandant of the Joint Forces Staff College (JFSC)

Aug 2021–Present - Director of Marine Corps Intelligence

External links

Marine Corps General Motivates Wrestlers, Officer Candidates
RANK ASIDE: MARINES DISCUSS SOLUTIONS
Lt. Col. William Seely sends a greeting to Scottsdale, Arizona from Camp Fallujah, Iraq for Father's Day 2008
3rd Recon leader accepts Bronze Star by recognizing full battalion
Nominees: PN1402 — 116th Congress (2019-2020)
Major General William H. Seely III, USMC

Year of birth missing (living people)
Living people
People from Ho Chi Minh City
Vietnamese refugees
Vietnamese emigrants to the United States
American University alumni
Oklahoma State University alumni
United States Marine Corps personnel of the Iraq War
United States Marine Corps personnel of the War in Afghanistan (2001–2021)
National Intelligence University alumni
Naval War College alumni
United States Marine Corps generals